Ciríaco is a municipality in the state of Rio Grande do Sul, Brazil.  As of 2020, the estimated population was 4,719.

2018 Tornado 
A strong F4 tornado passed through several municipalities in Rio Grande do Sul, causing two deaths and leaving behind thousands of damaged homes. Due to the intensity of the winds, at least three trucks traveling along the RS-463 highway, between the municipalities of Coxilha, and Tapejara, in the northern region of the state, were hurled off the roadway into adjacent fields. In the city of Água Santa, the tornado destroyed at least ten aviaries causing the death of more than 220,000 chickens. Large agricultural buildings were destroyed, farm machinery was tossed, and large metal storage silos were destroyed as well. Twenty-four communities were impacted by the tornado, and 2,630 homes were damaged or destroyed, a few of which were leveled. Some of the worst damage along the path of the tornado occurred in the Ciríaco area, where a man was found dead underneath his collapsed home. Countless trees and power poles were snapped along the path as well. An F0 tornado was also observed near Nova Conquista, a locality in the city of Chiapetta, but remained over open fields and caused no damage. In other locations in southern Brazil, the line of storms caused heavy rain accompanied by damaging winds and hail.

See also
List of municipalities in Rio Grande do Sul

References

Municipalities in Rio Grande do Sul